The Bishop of Lancaster is a suffragan bishop of the Church of England Diocese of Blackburn, in the Province of York, England. The title takes its name after the traditional county town of Lancaster in Lancashire; the See was erected under the Suffragans Nomination Act 1888 by Order in Council dated 24 July 1936. The current bishop is Jill Duff.

List of Anglican bishops

References

External links
 Crockford's Clerical Directory - Listings

Anglican bishops of Lancaster
Anglican suffragan bishops in the Diocese of Blackburn